Mohamed Islam Bouglia or Mohamed Islem Bouglia also spelled Med Islam Bouglia (born July 26 1997 in Tunis) is a Tunisian cyclist became paratriathlete following a road accident. He is African champion of paratriathlon PT2 in 2017 and 2018. He has several national and Arab championships to his credit, in the minimal and junior categories.

Biography 
Born July 26, 1997 in Tunis, is a Tunisian cyclist who became a paratriathlon following a road accident.  He is double African champion of paratriathlon in the PT2 category (2017 and 2018).

Mohamed Islam Bouglia is part of the national cycling team in Tunisia and has several national and Arab championships to his credit, in the minimal and junior categories. He was also second in the Arabian championship of Manama (Bahrain) in 2013 and participated in world competitions.

Mohamed Islam Bouglia is the son of actor and humorist Chawki Bouglia.

On October 29, 2015, Mohamed Islam Bouglia was visited by Maher Ben Dhia while he was hospitalized in a clinic and was financially supported by the ministry to undergo surgery.

Mohamed Islem has become a symbol of courage and determination in Tunisia.

Prize list 

 2018 Rabat ATU Triathlon African Championships and YOG Qualifier (PT2)   Rabat, Morocco       1st place

 2017 Yasmine Hammamet ATU Triathlon African Championships (PT2)    Yasmine Hammamet, Tunisia        1st place

References

External links

Living people
1997 births
Paratriathletes of Tunisia
Tunisian male triathletes
Tunisian amputees
21st-century Tunisian people